Zdeňka Mocová (born ) is a Czech female former volleyball player. She was part of the Czech Republic women's national volleyball team.

She competed at the 1994 FIVB Volleyball Women's World Championship, and at the 2001 Women's European Volleyball Championship. On club level she played with Olymp Praga in 1994.

References

1974 births
Living people
Czech women's volleyball players
Place of birth missing (living people)